Amílcar Barbuy (29 March 1893 – 24 August 1965) was an Italian Brazilian football player and manager. A talented and well-rounded midfielder, he was known for his commanding presence, pinpoint tackling, ability to read the game, powerful kicks and great long passes and was one of the greatest players of Corinthians.

For some veteran Corinthians supporters, Amílcar was the second most skilled and gifted Brazilian footballer, only behind Pelé.

He also played for Palestra Itália and Lazio, becoming the first Brazilian in the Italian Football. At the age of 38, he became the oldest player ever to debut in the Italian Serie A in 1931, a record which was only broken in 2016 by Maurizio Pugliesi, at the age of 39.

He played 19 games for Brazil, scoring five goals. He managed Lazio, São Paulo, Palestra Itália, Corinthians, Portuguesa, Portuguesa Santista and Atlético Mineiro.

References

External links
 
 
 Pelé.Net
 Milton Neves

1893 births
1965 deaths
Association football midfielders
Brazilian people of Italian descent
Brazilian footballers
Brazil international footballers
Brazilian football managers
Brazilian expatriate footballers
Brazilian expatriate football managers
Brazilian expatriate sportspeople in Italy
Expatriate footballers in Italy
Serie A players
Sport Club Corinthians Paulista players
Sociedade Esportiva Palmeiras players
S.S. Lazio players
S.S. Lazio managers
Expatriate football managers in Italy
São Paulo FC managers
Sport Club Corinthians Paulista managers
Copa América-winning players
Sociedade Esportiva Palmeiras managers
Footballers from São Paulo